Project A-ko: The Roleplaying Game is a tabletop role-playing game published by Dream Pod 9 in 1995.

Description
Project A-ko: The Roleplaying Game is based on the Project A-ko anime film.

Publication history
The design team of IANVS Publications (now Protoculture) created a new game system, Silhouette, so that they could start to publish their own role-playing games. Two years later, Jimmy Mah's Project A-Ko: The Roleplaying Game (1995) became the first Silhouette game of Dream Pod 9, which had been formed in 1994 to indicate a new beginning with the new game system. The game was published to be sold at Gen Con 26. The Silhouette game system that premiered in Project A-Ko was purposefully designed to be simple to make it quick and easy to play.

When Dream Pod 9 became a fully independent company, they kept the majority of the dozen employees from IANVS overseen by Pierre Oulette and they kept the roleplaying titles as well, including Project A-Ko. Rather than continue to supplement Project A-Ko, Dream Pod 9 instead created a second brand-new Silhouette game, Heavy Gear, in 1995.

Reception

Reviews
Rollespilsmagasinet Fønix (Danish) (Issue 10 - October/November 1995)

References

Canadian role-playing games
Dream Pod 9 games
Fantasy role-playing games based on anime and manga
Role-playing games introduced in 1995